Fingringhoe is a village and civil parish in Essex, England, located five miles south-east of Colchester. The centre of the village is classified as a conservation area, featuring a traditional village pond and red telephone box.  The Roman River flows nearby before entering the River Colne. It has been noted frequently on lists of unusual place names. The village's name actually derives from its geographic circumstances: it sits at the confluence of the smaller Roman River and the River Colne. A "hoe" refers to a jutting out piece of land while "finger" describes an elongated finger-like land extension. "Ing" is a common toponym in the UK referring to "peoples". As such, the name refers to the "people living on the land jutting out into the river".

Geography

Fingringhoe Wick
Fingringhoe is locally known for its salt marshes, which provide habitats for many birds and salt-water animals. These form part of the Fingringhoe Wick Nature Reserve managed by Essex Wildlife Trust.

History

Roman port
During the 1st Century AD Fingringhoe was home to a river port which serviced the nearby provincial capital of Roman Britain at Camulodunum (modern Colchester).

Middle Ages 
A manor located at Fingringhoe was donated by Henry I of England to the Norman abbey of Saint-Ouen at Rouen.

Trivia

Fingringhoe is mentioned in Lemon Jelly's "Ramblin' Man" and is in the top 20 list of "rude names" from the book Rude Britain.

Fingringhoe is one of many British towns and villages referenced in Karl Marx's Das Kapital as part of "Illustrations of the General Law of Capitalist Accumulation".

In 2009, an unexploded World War Two bomb was disarmed in the village.

Monuments

St. Andrew's Church
A prominent feature in the centre of the village, the north wall of St. Andrew's Church dates back to the 12th century.

References

External links
 Essex Wildlife Trust
 Fingringhoe Primary School
 

Villages in Essex